The Cedar Rapids Rampage was an American professional indoor soccer franchise based in Cedar Rapids, Iowa. Founded in June 2015, the team made its debut in the Major Arena Soccer League with the 2015–16 season. The team's name and logo were revealed at a press conference on July 16, 2015.

The team shared its ownership group with the Cedar Rapids Titans of the Indoor Football League, and sponsored an outdoor team the Cedar Rapids Rampage United that were a part of the Premier League of America.

History
Former Chicago Storm assistant and Rockford Rampage head coach Jeff Kraft was named the first head coach in franchise history. In the first home pre-season match in Cedar Rapids, the Rampage would lose 11-6 to the St. Louis Ambush at the U.S. Cellular Center on October 30, 2015.

The first regular season MASL game in Rampage history was November 6, 2015 at the Missouri Comets. The game saw first goal in franchise history, scored by forward Elmo Neto. The Rampage would go on to lose 8-7 in overtime. After an 0-7 start to the season (and two overtime losses), the Rampage would get their first win in a 9-7 comeback victory over the Ambush. Cedar Rapids had at one point trailed 7-2 in the third quarter, but used the quickest hat-trick from start-to-finish in MASL history by forward Alex Megson (41 seconds from the first to the third goals) to get back in the game. Player/assistant coach Carlos “Chile” Farias would score the game-tying and game-winning goals. Midway through the season, the Rampage would acquire forward Gordy Gurson who would go on to become arguably the face of the franchise. A much improved side would win four games the second half of the year and finish 5-15.

The 2016–17 Major Arena Soccer League season would be a turn-around season for the club. Kraft would be let go as head coach before the season, and Hewerton Moreira was promoted to replace him as a player-coach. Moreira would go on to finish second in the MASL record books for assists in a season with 29, and the Rampage would have their first winning record with a 12-8 mark, highlighted by wins over the Milwaukee Rampage and defending/eventual champions, Baltimore Blast. The Chicago Mustangs would edge Cedar Rapids for the last playoff spot, and would also beat the Rampage in a match that would tie the league record for fewest goals total in a match with 4 scored (3-1).

With the Mustangs voluntarily relegating themselves to MASL2, the Central would be cleared of the Rampage’s biggest nemesis for the 2017-18 Major Arena Soccer League season. Hewerton would leave to become the player-coach of St. Louis, and Jonathan Greenfield would be promoted to role of player-coach. The Rampage would start out with three narrow losses before a run of five straight wins to put them in contention for the Central Division title. A tumultuous December would see drama on and off the field. Bad weather, undesirable home dates, and sponsorship problems saw attendance dip. On the field, goalkeeper Brett Petricek was released and would sign with the Comets, and Greenfield would leave to play for the Baltimore Blast. Former Chicago Riot goalkeeper and Rockford Rampage goalkeeper/assistant Ante Cop was hired as the new head coach. Cop would lose his first match as head coach on December 31, 2017, 3-2 to the Baltimore Blast and his next three games after that. However, rookie goalkeeper Rainer Hauss and the rest of the team would thrive under Cop, winning five of their last seven matches. In that stretch, they would clinch their first ever playoff berth on February 16, 2018 with a 6-5 home win over the Baltimore Blast.

With reports that the team was for sale, and an availability conflict with the U.S. Cellular Center, the Rampage played their first “home” playoff match at The Odeum Expo Center in Villa Park, Illinois. The match would go on to be considered one of the greatest in Ron Newman Cup Playoffs history. The Rampage would battle the Milwaukee Wave in a seesaw affair, including a Mario Alvarez hat-trick and a late game-tying goal from Osvaldo Rojas to send the game to overtime where the Rampage would eventually lose. The second leg in Milwaukee was also back and forth, with a double-brace of four goals by Gordy Gurson. However, Game 2 would end in another one-goal Wave win for Milwaukee to take the series. Gurson would be named 3rd Team All-MASL and Hauss would be named goalkeeper on the MASL All-Rookie Team.

The team folded in 2018, and ownership reformed with many of the same players in Florida as the Orlando SeaWolves.

Year-by-Year

Personnel

2017–18

Active Players
As of 18 January 2018

Inactive Players

Notable former players

Sponsors

References

External links 

Official website

Association football clubs established in 2015
Indoor soccer clubs in the United States
Defunct soccer clubs in Iowa
Major Arena Soccer League teams
Sports in Cedar Rapids, Iowa
2015 establishments in Iowa
Defunct indoor soccer clubs in the United States
Association football clubs disestablished in 2018
2018 disestablishments in Iowa